Erfjord Bridge is a suspension bridge in the municipality of Suldal in Rogaland county, Norway.  The bridge was completed in November 1963 and it crosses the Erfjorden as part of the Norwegian National Road 13, a main road between the cities of Bergen and Stavanger in Western Norway.

References

Bridges completed in 1963
Bridges in Rogaland
Suldal
Suspension bridges in Norway